Torcon is the name given to three Worldcons held in Toronto, Ontario, Canada:

Torcon I, the 6th World Science Fiction Convention, held in 1948
Torcon II, the 31st World Science Fiction Convention, held in 1973
Torcon 3, the 61st World Science Fiction Convention, held in 2003